Mona al Mansouri is an international designer in the United Arab Emirates  who graduated with a double major in geological and biological engineering. She worked  as an engineer in the geophysical petroleum industry. Starting in 1991, she became an Emirate fashion designer.

Fashion Shows

(Selective)

 Fashion show in Malaga, Spain in attendance of more than 10,000 audiences, ruler of Malaga and the responsible of fashion in Spain government.
 Opening show of London Arabia art & Fashion week 2016.
 Opening show of Women Entrepreneurs show - Salalah.
 Fashion show in Moscow 2016.
 Fashion show in Umm al-Quwain in the presence of and under patronage of Sheikha Somaya Alqasmy the wife of the ruler of Umm al-Quawin.
 Opening show of Chic lady Abu Dhabi in attendance of the French singer Diese.
 Organizing and opening Nefertiti International fashion festival in Egypt 2016.
 Opening Bahrain fashion show Under the patronage of the wife of the king of Bahrain Sheikha Sabika in the presence of princesses and Business women.
 Fashion Show at the SME World Summit 2016.
 Opening fashion show of Ajman wedding fair 2016.
 Opening of International fashion week Dubai 2016.
 Fashion show under the patronage of Sheikha Fatima Bint Mubarak for the entrepreneurs and business women.
 Opening Caftanos fashion show Paris 2016.
 Fashion show under the auspices of League of Arab States Arab Women Investors Union and the Association of the elderly in Beirut 2015, in attendance of a lot of Celebrities, Business women and ambassadors.
 Opening Beirut fashion show 2015 in attendance of Arabic stars Elham Shaheen, Mevat Ameen, Bosy Shalby, Ruwaida Almahroky, Ghada Ragab .
 Opening and guest of honor for Chic lady Abu Dhabi 2015 in attendance of the Arabic star Ruwaida al mahrouqi.
 Opening The Fashion Festival in Bali 2015.
Opening of the international fashion festival (Coftanos) in Morocco 2015.
Guest of honor of Gulf bride fashion show 2015.
Opening the Bridal Fashion Show at the Ajman palace hotel.
Fashion show (Anaqet Alkhaleej) in Oman 2015.
Fashion show in 2014 at Dubai Mall .
Fashion show in 2014 at Sharjah perfect wedding, this show was named snow queen.
Fashion show on the occasion of the National Day organized by Saidty magazine in presence of the stars Balqees, Shama Hemdan, Amira Fadl, Dr. Aysha AL Busmait and many artists.
Fashion show at Oman in 2014 under the patronage of Dr. Mona Bnt Fahd Al Said.
Wonders of east show at Sharjah ladies club under the patronage of the wife of the ruler of Sharjah Sheikha Jawaher Alqasimi.
Fashion  show at grand Hayat Hotel, for the occasion of mother day.
Fashion show in 2013 on the opening of women's exhibition at World Trade Center under the auspices of Nahyan Bin Mubarak Al Nahyan the Minister of Culture and Youth.
Fashion show at the Dubai festival city including a dress with a 3D design of Milestones of Dubai on occasion of the National Day and for winning the bid for Expo 2020.
Fashion show at Zabeel Ladies Club under the auspices and in presence of Hessa Bin Hemdan Al Maktoum.
Fashion show in 2013 at Beirut on the "longest catwalk in the world through Mediterranean Sea", Mona Mansouri opened the fashion week.
In her top fashion show, Mona Mansouri was honored by Sheikha Fatima Bent Mubarak, on establishment of Abu-Dhabi Women's Council
On the invitation and auspices of Sheikha Latifa Bent Khalifa, she held the first gallery in the Kingdom of Bahrain.
Fashion show in 2012 at Beau-Riv-age Palace, Lausanne, Switzerland under the auspices and in presence of Dr. Sultan Bin Khalifa Al Nahyan on occasion of the National Day and Emirate- Swiss Friendship Council.
Fashion show in November 2011 at London in presence of U.A.E ambassador, Sheikha Hind Al Qassimi and several top figures and diplomats.
Brides fashion shows in 2010, 2011, 2012 in Abu-Dhabi under the auspices of Sheikha Sheikha spouse of Sultan Bin Khalifa.
In 2010, Mona AL Mansouri was selected to open Al-Aroos Annual Fashion Show in Biel, Beirut with dresses worn by Nagwa Sultan and Fulla. The latter wore a garment designed by Al Mansouri highlighting the theme "Emirates of Summits", with a picture of Khalifa Tower. on it, indicating that Dubai will reach the top. Khalifa Tower.
In 2009, Mona AL Mansouri held a fashion show under the auspices of Sheikha Hind Al Qassimi, including a dress with a message to the World Health Organization during the swine flu epidemic protesting the commercialization for the pharmaceutical industry.
She held a fashion show for Abu-Dhabi Fashion Week in 2008. The fashion show features a dress conveying a message against child obesity.
In 2009, Mona Al Mansouri was selected to open fashion shows during the New Look exhibition in Al-Ain, with a Dress of Islands, calling on Iran to end its occupation of the three Emirate islands. Artists each in their own field were invited to contribute to the event.
She held a fashion show during the International Jewelry Show event in 2006 under the auspices of Sheikha Fatima Bent Mubarak. The show surprise was the media personality Lujain Umran, wearing an Emirate garment with the word "benevolence" written on it in all languages, in support for Sheikh Mohammed Bin Rashid Al Maktoum's benevolence cam
paign initiative. With the book of "My Vision" by Sheikh Mohammed Hamdan Bin Mohammed Al Maktoum in hand, Lujain took the stage accompanied by poetry of his son, praising his father's traits and benevolence.
In the Italian Fashion Week 2006, Mona Mansouri was the first Emirate designer to display in Rome. The show featured a dress worn by Miss Italy advocating environmental issues. This was followed by other international shows in Italy.
Media figure Amira Fadl wore a dress holding the best thank-you message for Sheikha Fatima Bin Mubarak. The designed dress included a long 20 meter tail, and characterized by a big red heart. The show was during Al-Aroos exhibition in Al-Ain.
Mona was selected for a traditional fashion show for invitees to the Middle East Film Festival held in 2008 at Emirates Palace, Abu-Dhabi.
In 2007, Mona AL Mansouri was selected to represent the U.A.E along with top designers at Abu-Dhabi Fashion Week. The star of the show was Mai Al Hariri, who wore a Mona Mansouri designed dress in a combination of sky-blue and turquoise symbolizing Abu-Dhabi blue sky and sea, portraying Abu-Dhabi's progress.
She was invited to Egypt by Egypt Lovers Association, holding a fashion show supporting the vote for Bu Tina Island to be one of the natural seven wonders of the world. Her promotional design for the campaign received a great deal of media attention in Egypt for the innovative idea spotlighting the show.

Honors and awards

She was honored as Designer of the Year 2010, as the designer who was the most influential on the society, from the French magazine l'officiel.

References

Emirati fashion designers
Living people
Emirati bioengineers
Emirati women engineers
21st-century women engineers
Year of birth missing (living people)
Emirati women fashion designers